Bolton Airport was an airfield operational in the mid-20th century in Clinton, Massachusetts.

References

Defunct airports in Massachusetts
Airports in Worcester County, Massachusetts
Clinton, Massachusetts